is a professional Japanese baseball player. He plays infielder for the Chiba Lotte Marines.

References 

1999 births
Living people
Baseball people from Fukushima Prefecture
Japanese baseball players
Nippon Professional Baseball infielders
Tohoku Rakuten Golden Eagles players
Chiba Lotte Marines players
Yokohama DeNA BayStars players
People from Aizuwakamatsu